is a manhwa series created and drawn by Lee Kang-woo, writing under the pen name of Woo. It has been published in serialized format in the Korean weekly comic magazine Comic Champ since 1998. The series was completed in 2010 with twenty-six volumes in Korea.

Rebirth is the story of a 17th-century vampire named Deshwitat L. Rudbich. It follows his adventures after he is cast into a 300-year limbo by his enemies.

Rebirth is published in English by Tokyopop, with adaptation by Bryce P. Coleman and Aaron Sparrow. As of February 2009, twenty-two volumes have been published in English. Rebirth is published in Swedish by Wahlströms. The Swedish release started in summer 2005,
with three volumes in the series released by the end of the year. Rebirth is published in Italy by Flashbook.

Plot

In the 17th century, the God of White Magic, Kalutika Maybus, neared the end of a battle against the vampire Deshwitat L. Rudbich. Kalutika killed Deshwitat's fiancée, Lilith and sealed Deshwitat in limbo.

In the 21st century a band of spiritual investigators led by Sang-Ho Do, uncovers a band of demons. Engaging in combat, most of the party is quickly killed, leaving only Sang-Ho, his daughter Remi, and an exorcist, Millenear Shephield. They are about to be defeated when Remi bleeds onto a pile of dust. Her blood inadvertently breaks the seal that binds Deshwitat, releasing him.

Deshwitat is too weak to fight the demons. Sang-Ho decides to sacrifice himself to Deshwitat to give him enough power to save his daughter and Millenear. After Deshwitat metamorphoses Sang-Do's body into resurrection dust, he reassures her that upon his death, her father would return to life as a human being. He enlists Millenear's help to learn light magic to defeat Kalutika, as he believes his dark magic is not powerful enough. Millenear tells him that she is unable to teach light magic herself, but she does know of a Buddhist monastery in Hong Kong that could be able to instruct him. The three arrive at the monastery only to be attacked by a swordsman and his companion. Deshwitat discovers that the swordsman is his old friend Rett Butler, who should have died over 300 years ago. His companion Beryun engages in battle with Deshwitat.

Deshwitat discovers that Beryun is skilled in both light and dark magic. Millenear discovers that she is not human. Deshwitat and Beryun battle until Master Tae, who is in charge of the monastery, stops them, revealing that she had never ordered an attack on Deshwitat. He attacks Master Tae, but is soundly beaten. Tae reveals that Deshwitat is prophesied to be the key to humanity's salvation.

Rett was supposed to help Deshwitat during his battle against Kalutika. He was too late to help, and tried to avenge his friend, but was severely wounded, and his men were killed. Kalutika made Rett immortal so that he could see the Armageddon.

The monks are unable to instruct Deshwitat on how to learn the magic of the light. He discovers that he may be able to learn this at the Vatican. The group goes to the Vatican. Deshwitat and Millenear fight when he reduces a girl to resurrection dust, and she is beaten. It is revealed that Millenear is an unfrocked priest.

Deshwitat learns that a priest wishes to meet him. He is ambushed by a large group of priests, which also include the elite special forces unit of the Catholic Church, the Order of St. Michael. He soon succumbs to his injuries and is about to be destroyed when Lilith appears to him in a vision. She reawakens his thirst for vengeance, and he devastates the party, taking one of the Order of St. Michael, a girl named Erica, hostage.

Deshwitat soon reunites with everyone and confronts the Bishop, who reveals that he wanted Deshwitat murdered because he could not accept the truth that a being of darkness would be the savior. He instructs Millenear to kill Deshwitat, giving her back her standing in the church. Millenear turns on the Bishop and blasts him with white magic, causing him to shapeshift into a creature of white magic. With the Order quickly unlocking the seal, Deshwitat regains his magical power. However, even Deshwitat's full strength is not enough to stop the creature. Only by teaming up with Erica to combine their attacks is the creature destroyed.

Deshwitat and the others return to Asia. It is discovered that Lilith is still alive. Deshwitat is encouraged by the fact that he managed to defeat Millenear in their fight, as it means that dark magic can defeat light magic. Master Tae tells them that Kalutika has begun his apocalypse. She introduces their newest companion, Eiji Inaba, a ninja. Deshwitat decides to test him along with Millenear and Remi. Should they land a single scratch on him within a ten-minute time limit, they can stay. None of the three can harm him, and he rejects them all. Master Tae insists that they take Eiji since he is vital to contacting the New York ninja sect.

In New York, Grey, the proclaimed Lord of the Vampires, kidnaps Millenear and Belose, a New York vampire uses a bomb to destroy them. Deshwitat uses his Dark Barrier and Beryun uses her Arson's Shield to protect them from the attack. They open a box Deshwitat was given and find a vampire's sand of the dead. Remi uses her blood to revive it, and Draistail appears. Draistail offers to train Deshwitat, but Deshwitat refuses, insisting that he has to go save Millenear. Draistail traps him, saying that he is not yet ready.

Meanwhile, Rett and Beryun decide to go save Millenear themselves, but are beaten by Grey. Deswhitat escapes from Draistail, and goes to aid Rett and Beryun, who are near death. He begins to battle Grey, who stops the fight, saying they will continue it at the Vampire Lord Tournament. At the tournament, Deshwitat faces off against Millenear. Millenear admits to Deshwitat that she is in love with him. He seemingly scorns her and promises to give her a quick death. Millenear uses this to her advantage by wearing him out. When it seems that Deshwitat is too tired to fight, Millenear says that she will not only kill him, but herself too. Deshwitat stops her and embraces her, telling her that in another time, he would have loved her, and that he had failed to protect her just as he failed to protect Lilith. He is able to beat her and advance to battle Grey.

Draistail leads Rett, Beryun, Remi, and the Order of St. Michael into a trap that he along with Grey and the Council of 6 had set up. Grey calls the Elder vampire to let them go, and he allows Deshwitat to strike him in the chest, severely wounding him. After that, Lilith arrives and destroys the vampire race along with the five of the Council of 6. Under Kalutika's influence, she moves to kill him but he is saved by the Elder Vampire, who teleports them to safety. Deshwitat is elevated to Vampire Lord, whose role in the world is to lead the vampires against the gods. The Elder dies, leaving Deshwitat apparently the last vampire in existence.

While Deshwitat trains, Rett and the others go to meet Rang. She has gained power by drinking Millenear's blood, the blood of a "god seed." She has little control over her new-found powers and Rett and his companions kill her.

In Hong Kong, before reviving Millenear, Rett and the others question Master Tae about Millenear's origin. She explains to them that Millenear is indeed a "god seed" and when her human life ends, Millenear will become a god. They decide to keep this information from Millenear and revive her. The groups prepare for a battle in Tibet, which will decide the fate of the world before Deshwitat can come back.

Characters
Deshwitat L. Rudbich 
 Deshwitat was born in the 17th century to a vampire father and a human mother. His family was killed by Kalutika's father, but Kalutika saved Deshwitat. He attempted to move the young vampire into hiding, but was followed by his father. Kalutika held off his father long enough for the young vampire to escape, only to be captured by a circus troop. Deshwitat remained there for several years until he met Lilith. Emboldened by her kindness, Deshwitat broke free of the circus and roamed the countryside for years, becoming a powerful dark magician. He was never particularly evil, but held his status with dignity. He is awoken in the modern day to find Kalutika's forces rising in power. Deshwitat now seeks the means to destroy Kalutika, and after completing his quest he plans to let himself die. Though Deshwitat appears cold and cruel, he is often capable of acts of compassion.

Kalutika Maybus 
 Kalutika was once one of Deshwitat's closest friends and his confidant until he failed to save Kalutika's sister, Danube, from death. He was killed by soldiers and was revived in a ceremony that turned him into a God. He now seeks to destroy humanity for its cruelty to him while he was alive. He is a God Seed.

Millenear Shephield 
 A 21-year-old exorcist, Millenear was orphaned at an early age and placed in the care of her uncle and aunt. They were abusive and one day, Millenear killed them with her spiritual rage. Priest Williams took her in and taught her how to focus her powers to help people. She became one of the best exorcists employed by the Vatican until she disobeyed the head Bishop of the Vatican to save a possessed girl using her dark magic abilities. She lost her standing as a priest and left the service. Though Deshwitat is often critical of her, she continues with him on his quest to defeat Kalutika. She was captured by Mr. Grey during an assassination attempt on Deshwitat and was mutated into a vampiress.

Remi Do 
 The 17-year-old daughter of Sang-Ho Do, a supernatural investigator. She is angry at Deshwitat for draining her father's blood, but the vampire assures her that Sang-Ho can be resurrected after he himself is slain. Despite her dislike for the vampire, Remi works with Deshwitat to eliminate Kalutika in order to revive her father. Remi has some natural combat abilities, as she is undergoing training to become a shaman of earth magic. She is seen to become quite powerful later on in the series as she is able to join the Order of St. Michael along with Renji in the Tower of Trials.

Rett Butler 
 Rett is Deshwitat's best friend and fighting partner, both in the past and in the present. Rett led a party of men to attempt to stop Kalutika's rebirth into a God, but arrived too late. Because of their past friendship, Kalutika forced immortality on him so that Rett would have to witness the end of the world. Rett is a good-natured and rowdy man who enjoys beer, women, and good living. He is often able to read Deshwitat's true feelings, no matter how much the vampire tries to conceal them. He is quite lecherous, particularly to Millenear, Remy and Beryun. He was also in love with Master Tae in her youth, but did not pursue the relationship because he would have to see her grow old and die. Some refer to him as 'Hellrasier'.

Beryun 
 A spiritual warrior created by Master Tae, fulfilling her promise of creating an immortal companion for Rett. Beryun is the only person capable of simultaneously wielding light and dark magic. Despite her appearance, she isn't human. Despite the fact that she literally has no personality and is cold to her teammates, she is devoted to them and is willing to put herself at risk to save them.

Lilith Servino 
 A young noblewoman, known for her kindness and charity. Lilith fell deeply in love with the vampire Deshwitat, helping him rediscover his humanity after years of cruelty from humans. Kalutika revived Lilith to serve as his consort. She is very powerful, gaining power from Kalutika. Though Lilith opposes Kalutika's plans for the world, she is powerless to stop him directly. Despite Deshwitat's long absence, she is still very much in love with him. It is revealed that she is the mother of Grey. She is called the "Holy Golden Mother of Light."

Master Tae 
 The head of a Buddhist temple for light magic, Master Tae has been watching the events leading to the possible end of the world unfold. She guides the Deshwitat party in their quest to stop Kalutika and also trains Remy and Millenear to improve their talents in order for them to be better able to assist Deshwitat, Rett, and Beryun. In her youth, Master Tae was in love with Rett Butler, but seeing his pain at having outlived his friends and family, she swore to him that she would create a partner for him who would also be immortal. She dedicated much of her life in creating a partner for Rett, ultimately culminating in the creation of Beryun. Shortly after announcing that she fulfilled her promise, Rett confessed to her that if he could have fallen in love with another woman, it would have been her. She still has a room that holds an old photograph of her and Rett in her youth, possibly dating from the 1930s.

Mr. Grey 
 The would-be lord of the vampire race. Currently the most powerful vampire alive, Grey's mission is to destroy Deshwitat. It is hinted that Grey is in fact the son of Deshwitat and Lilith, despite him saying that he is the son of Kalutika and Lilith. His greatest asset is his limitless stamina, no matter how often he regenerates or how much power he uses, he never weakens.

Eiji Inaba
 Eiji is a ninja who was sent to lead Deshwitat, Rett, and Beryun to New York. Upon arriving there, his fellow kunoichi were found already killed (by Mr. Grey). Since then, he has stayed with Deshwitat's group. He is lecherous, especially towards Remi.

Draestail
 Draestail was in the form of vampire ash in a box that was given to Deshwitat. Using Remi's blood he was brought back to life to help train Deshwitat for his battle against Kalutika and for the Lord of the Vampires tournament. He is a lecherous but crafty old man, to Eiji's awe and Deshwhitat's disgust.

Production
Millenear Shephield's last name is derived from American baseball player, Gary Sheffield. Woo depicted Deshwitat to be a 28-year-old demon because he is "sick of the 13-17-year-old other pretty boys that seem to populate every other manhwa title out there right now." He also wanted a "manly man" for a lead character. Millenear was planned to be a "useless sidekick hanging around the main character". However, due to the fun in drawing her, Woo hinted that she might be the female heroine.

References

External links

Action-adventure comics
Fantasy comics
Daewon C.I. titles
1998 comics debuts
Vampires in comics
Manhwa titles
Tokyopop titles